Robert Ogilvie Noakes (13 May 1947 – 11 November 2022) was a Scottish singer-songwriter. Noakes was at the forefront of Scottish folk music for over 50 years and recorded over 19 studio albums. He toured folk clubs and often performed at the Glasgow music festival Celtic Connections.

In 1970 he released his first album Do You See the Lights, a blend of easy-going country rock, and included songs "Too Old to Die", "Together Forever" and "Somebody Counts on Me". In 1971 Noakes was a founding member of the folk rock band Stealers Wheel, along with Gerry Rafferty and Joe Egan. He played on Rafferty's Can I Have My Money Back, notably "Mary Skeffington". He recorded with Lindisfarne in 1972, on songs "Turn a Deaf Ear", "Nicely Out of Tune", "Together Forever", and "Fog on the Tyne". He performed with Lindisfarne for a John Peel concert and in 1995 produced a BBC Radio 2 programme The Story of Lindisfarne. One of his best-known recordings, "Branch", from his Red Pump Special album, received airplay on BBC Radio 1. Noakes' songs have been covered by Lindisfarne and Barbara Dickson.

Biography
Robert Ogilvie Noakes was born in St Andrews, Fife, on 13 May 1947, and brought up in Cupar.

In 1963 Noakes moved to London and worked for the Civil Service, where he played folk clubs at night. He returned to Scotland in 1967 and began a duo with Robin McKidd; they played their first gig at the Glasgow Folk centre, and in the same year he secured a month's residency in Denmark. 

Noakes released his first album Do You See The Lights in 1970, with a line-up that included ex-partner Robin McKidd on electric guitar and Scottish jazz bassist Ronnie Rae. This recording included the songs "Too Old to Die", "Together Forever", and "Somebody Counts on Me". 

Noakes was a founding member of the folk rock band Stealers Wheel, along with Gerry Rafferty and Joe Egan in 1971. He sang backing vocals and played on the first solo album by Rafferty, Can I Have My Money Back, most notably on "Mary Skeffington", a song about Rafferty's mother. After these sessions he became an early member of Stealers Wheel, while he left them before the release of the band's first album. 

Noakes recorded and performed with Lindisfarne, whom he supported on a national tour in 1972, and recorded his songs "Turn a Deaf Ear" on their first album, Nicely Out of Tune, and "Together Forever" on their second, Fog on the Tyne. Barbara Dickson recorded "Turn a Deaf Ear" on her album Do Right Woman, on which Noakes performed.
 
In May 1972, the British music magazine NME reported that Noakes was to appear at the Great Western Express Lincoln Festival on 26 May that year. Other acts to perform in the 'Giants of Tomorrow' marquee included Budgie, Skin Alley, Tea & Sympathy, John Martyn, Warhorse, and Gnidrolog. One of Noakes's best-known recordings, "Branch", was released as a single in the summer of 1974 from his album Red Pump Special, which was recorded in Nashville, Tennessee, and produced by Elliot Mazer, attracted considerable airplay on BBC Radio 1, but without making the UK Singles Chart.

The album Restless (1978) was produced by Terry Melcher at Starling Sounds, based at Tittenhurst Park, Ascot, former home of John Lennon and Yoko Ono, then owned by Ringo Starr. The albums, Rab Noakes (1980) and Under the Rain (1984) followed, but it was 1994 until Standing Up appeared. Noakes subsequently toured with the Varaflames, containing Pick Withers, Rod Clements, and the harmonicist Fraser Speirs.

Later career and albums

Noakes became the senior producer for music programmes on BBC Radio Scotland. He left to create the production company Neon. 

In November 2007, his album Unlimited Mileage, again with the Varaflames, was released. In 2012, CDs of Standing Up Again made in 2009 and Just in Case (recorded in 2007) were made available; those albums only having been available to download up until then.

In 2015, he released the album I'm Walking Here. It was his 19th solo album and many of the songs tell the story of his working life as a songwriter and performer. It is a double album containing 26 songs. The first set consists of new compositions that show his gift for melody and love of Americana, and include "Out of Your Sight", influenced by Buddy Holly, a tribute to a 1920s minstrel singer, and a poignant lament for Rafferty. The second album is dominated by "interpretations" (he hated the word covers) of songs from early Cliff Richard to Garbage and Beck, along with the skiffle standard "Freight Train", on which he was joined by Jimmie MacGregor, and a finely sung treatment of the traditional "The Two Sisters".

On 20 July 2017, he appeared on the BBC quiz programme Eggheads.

Personal life   
In 1988, he met Stephanie Pordage and they married in 1998. She became his muse, manager and collaborator. They both left the BBC to set up their own production company Neon in 1995. Pordage died from the effects of Parkinson's disease in 2021. Noakes was diagnosed with tonsil cancer in 2015, but treatment was effective and he was back recording The Treatment Tapes in 2016. He also toured in 2017 – at the Leith folk club and with a full band at Celtic Connections. In 2022, Noakes continued to tour and work in collaboration with other singers.

Noakes died on 11 November 2022, suddenly, at the age of 75, in hospital in Glasgow.

Albums (including reissues)

References

External links
Official website

[ Rab Noakes] at Allmusic
 
 

1947 births
2022 deaths
People from St Andrews
Scottish singer-songwriters
People from Cupar
Scottish songwriters
Decca Records artists
Warner Records artists
A&M Records artists